A Very Rosie Christmas is the fifth album by American singer-songwriter Rosie Thomas, released in 2008. It is her first holiday album and features vocals from her friends and family members. The album mixes original songs with cover versions.

Thomas said of the album: "I've always loved to work on Christmas songs; Growing up, every Christmas Eve we entertained the family that came over 'cause my parents were musicians.  I've had a blast doing this."

The album includes a comedy skit featuring Thomas's Sheila Saputo character. Damien Jurado guests on "Sheila's Christmas Miracle".

Reception
PopMatters gave the album a 6/10 rating, with Ben Child calling it "a pleasant batch of jazz-pop Christmas songs". The Capital Times described the album as "cute", with Rob Thomas stating "She has a quirky but affecting voice, a wry sense of humor and a deep, questioning Christian faith, and brings them all to bear on this winsome collection." The Tucson Weekly gave it a positive review, with Stephen Seigel viewing Thomas's original songs as the highlights.

The album was included at number 35 in Rolling Stones "40 Essential Christmas Albums", describing it as "charming and heartfelt". The Miami New Times included it in their "The Best Christmas Albums of 2008".

Track listing
All songs written by Rosie Thomas unless otherwise stated.

 "Christmastime Is Here" – 3:08 (Originally by Vince Guaraldi Trio)
 "Why Can't It Be Christmastime All Year" – 4:25
 "River" – 3:05 (Originally by Joni Mitchell)
 "Winter Wonderland" – 3:23 (Music and lyrics by Felix Bernard & Richard B. Smith)
 "Silent Night" – 4:14 (Music and lyrics by Joseph Mohr & Franz Gruber)
 "O Come O Come Emmanuel" – 3:35 (Lyrics from Latin text by John Mason Neale)
 "Snow Day" – 3:54
 "Alone At Christmastime" – 2:59
 "Christmas Don't Be Late" – 6:40 (Originally by The Chipmunks)
 "Let It Snow" – 2:39 (Music and lyrics by Sammy Cahn & Jule Styne)
 "Sheila's Christmas Miracle" – 8:54
 "Rosie's Christmas Wish" – 2:21

References

Rosie Thomas (singer-songwriter) albums
2008 Christmas albums
Christmas albums by American artists